The Stains is a hardcore punk band from the Boyle Heights neighborhood of Los Angeles, California. One of the first East Los Angeles punk groups, the band started playing punk in 1976.  Their debut album, produced by SST Records house producer Spot, was recorded in 1981, and released by SST in 1983. The debut album is often considered influential in bridging Hardcore punk and Heavy Metal before the creation of Thrash Metal.  The band has been on tours with Black Flag, Hüsker Dü and countless others.  They were one of the bands that played at a 2001 "anniversary show" memorializing the landmark East Los Angeles punk venue Vex Populi (and music writer Josh Kun wrote in Los Angeles magazine that their set was "punk rock enough for the Stains to leave a pool of blood on the stage's wood beams").

On the album, the band's members were Jesus Amezquita, lead guitar, Robert Becerra, guitar;  Viscarra, bass; Gilbert Berumen, drums; and Rudy Navarro, vocalist.  Their style is described as hardcore and speedy, and as an innovator in bringing elements of metal into hardcore. Guitarist Robert Becerra's performance style was a model for Greg Ginn's musical concepts for Black Flag.  Viscarra and another Stains drummer, Louie Dufau, later played with Dez Cadena in his post-Black Flag band DC3, and Viscarra also played with cowpunk band Blood on the Saddle.

References

Hardcore punk groups from California
SST Records artists